Bhupen Kumar Borah (born 30 October 1970) is an Indian politician of Indian National Congress from Assam, India. He is serving as the President of Assam Pradesh Congress Committee since 2021. He also served as the Member of the Legislative Assembly for Bihpuria constituency from 2006 to 2006.

Electoral statistics

References

Indian National Congress politicians from Assam
Living people
1970 births
Assam MLAs 2006–2011
Assam MLAs 2011–2016